Varvodić is a Croatian surname. Notable people with the surname include:

Miro Varvodić (born 1989), Croatian footballer
Zoran Varvodić (born 1969), Croatian footballer

Croatian surnames